Polygrammodes maculiferalis is a moth in the family Crambidae. It was described by Harrison Gray Dyar Jr. in 1910. It is found in Guyana and French Guiana.

References

Spilomelinae
Moths described in 1910
Moths of South America